Justina Gringytė (born 1986) is a Lithuanian operatic mezzo-soprano. A former Samling and Jette Parker Young Artist, Gringytė trained as a pianist before commencing her studies at the Lithuanian Academy of Music and Theatre before joining the Royal Welsh College of Music and London's National Opera Studio.

During her time as a member of the Jette Parker Young Artists programme, Gringytė's roles included Maddalena (Rigoletto), Flora Bervoix (La Traviata), Wood Nymph (Rusalka), Maddalena (Il viaggio a Reims), Innocent (The Minotaur), Albina (La donna del lago) and Suzy (La rondine). Gringytė made her house debut in the 2013/14 season as Maddalena in Guisseppe Verdi's Rigoletto before appearing with the Welsh National Opera as Fenena in Nabucco. In 2014/15, Gringytė reprised the role of Maddalena at the Royal Opera House and The Bolshoi, and debuted the role of Hänsel in Hänsel und Gretel for the Vilnius City Opera. The 2014/15 season also saw Gringytė debut the title role in Carmen, a role in which she has received critical acclaim. Her debut recording, The Complete Rachmaninov Songs with pianist Iain Burnside, was nominated for a 2014 Gramophone Award.

In 2015, Gringytė won in the category of Young Singer at the International Opera Awards.

Discography 
 Rachmaninov: Songs (2014)
Medtner: Songs (2018)

External links 
 Official Website
Rayfield Allied

References 

1986 births
Living people
People from Alytus
Lithuanian opera singers
Operatic mezzo-sopranos
20th-century Lithuanian women singers
21st-century women opera singers